The Ghost Dance is a Native American ceremony.

Ghost Dance may also refer to:

Books 
 Ghost Dance (novel), a 1970 historical fiction novel by John Norman
 Ghost Dance, the third novel in a children's fantasy trilogy by Susan Price
 The Ghost Dance: The Origins of Religion, a 1970 nonfiction book by Weston La Barre

Film and television 
 The Ghost Dance (film), a 1982 American Western slasher film
 Ghost Dance (film), a 1983 British drama film
 "Ghost Dance", the sixth and final episode of Into the West

Music 
 Ghost Dance (band), a British gothic rock and post-punk band

Albums 
 Ghost Dance (Brian Tarquin album), 1996
 Ghost Dance (The Cult album), a 1996 album by The Cult
 Ghost Dance (The Pine Hill Haints album), 2007

Songs
"Ghost Dance", a 1978 song by the Patti Smith Group on the album Easter
"Ghost Dance", a 1994 song by Robbie Robertson on the album Music for The Native Americans
"Ghost Dance", a 1997 song by Cusco on the album Apurimac III: Nature-Spirit-Pride
"Ghost Dance", a 2007 song by Tomahawk on the album Anonymous

See also 
 Ghost Dance War, an 1890–1891 armed conflict between the Lakota and the United States
 Ghost shirt, a garment worn by some of the dancers in the ceremonies
 "Ghostdancing", a 1983 song by Simple Minds
 Spirit Dance (disambiguation)